The silver-backed tanager (Stilpnia viridicollis), also known as the silvery tanager, is a species of bird in the tanager family. It is found in humid highland forests in southern Ecuador, Peru, and Bolivia. It is regularly spotted at Machu Picchu.

References

silver-backed tanager
Birds of the Ecuadorian Andes
Birds of the Peruvian Andes
silver-backed tanager
silver-backed tanager
Taxonomy articles created by Polbot
Taxobox binomials not recognized by IUCN